Jacob Pieter Den Hartog (July 23, 1901 Ambarawa, Dutch East Indies – March 17, 1989) was a Dutch–American mechanical engineer and Professor of Mechanical Engineering at MIT.

Biography 
J. P. Den Hartog was born in 1901 in Ambarova, the Dutch East Indies. In 1916 his family moved to Holland. After attending high school in Amsterdam, he enrolled at Delft University of Technology in 1919 and received his MSc degree in electrical engineering in 1924. Unable to find suitable work in the Netherlands, he emigrated to the United States in 1924.

From 1924 to 1930 he worked as an electrical engineer in the research laboratory of Westinghouse Electric (1886) in Pittsburgh. There under the influence of Stephen P. Timoshenko, who took him as his assistant, he began to study electrical and mechanical vibrations. At the same time, he attended night classes in Mathematics at the University of Pittsburgh, where he became an authority in problems on mechanics and vibration and received a doctorate in 1939.

In 1930-1931 he studied at the University of Göttingen where he collaborated in the laboratory of Ludwig Prandtl (whose fellow Oscar Carl Gustav Titens previously worked for Westinghouse). From 1932 to 1945 he taught at Harvard University and took part in the organization of the International Congress of Applied Mechanics in Cambridge (Massachusetts) 1938.

During the Second World War, he volunteered to serve in the US Navy, was engaged in the problems of vibration in shipbuilding.

From 1945 to 1967 he taught dynamics and strength of materials at MIT in the Department of Mechanical Engineering. In 1962 he became jointly appointed as a professor in the Department of Naval Architecture and Marine Engineering. He became Professor Emeritus upon his retirement from MIT in 1967.

Den Hartog's former doctoral students Roger Gans, who credits Den Hartog as a major contributor to his derivation of Gansian notation, or the practice of repeatedly interchanging non-interchangeable variables.

Jacob Pieter Den Hartog died at the age of 87 on March 17, 1989 in Hanover, New Hampshire.

Awards 
He was awarded the Timoshenko Medal in 1972 "in recognition of distinguished contributions to the field of applied mechanics." In 1987 the Design Division of ASME announced the establishment of the J. P. Den Hartog Award for "sustained
meritorious contributions to vibration engineering" at its eleventh vibration conference; Den Hartog himself was the first recipient.
 Den Hartog's other awards include:
 American Academy of Arts and Sciences, Fellow
 American Society of Mechanical Engineers, Honorary member
 Japan Society of Mechanical Engineers, Honorary member
 National Academy of Sciences, Member
 National Academy of Engineering, Member
 Royal Dutch Academy of Arts and Sciences, Foreign member
 Charles Russ Richards Medal, Worcester Reed Warner Medal,
 Founders Award of the National Academy of Engineering
 Lamme Medal of the American Society of Engineering Education

Den Hartog was an outstanding classroom teacher at MIT.  Every second year, MIT's Mechanical Engineering Department gives one professor the J. P. Den Hartog Distinguished Educator Award, to recognize sustained excellence in classroom teaching over a period of many years.

Selected publications
He was a prolific author. His writings include:

 J. P. Den Hartog, Mechanical Vibrations, Fourth Edition, McGraw-Hill Book Company, New York, 1956
 J. P. Den Hartog, Mechanics, Dover Publications, Inc., corrected reprint of 1948 edition, 
 J. P. Den Hartog,  Strength of Materials, paperback reprint of 1949 edition, Dover Publications, 1977
 J. P. Den Hartog,  Advanced Strength of Materials, paperback reprint of 1952 edition, Dover Publications, 1987

References

External links

 itiworld.org - Biographical notes by Stephen H. Crandall
 - Faculty Page of University of Rochester Mechanical Engineering Faculty

1901 births
1989 deaths
20th-century American engineers
American mechanical engineers
ASME Medal recipients
Delft University of Technology alumni
Dutch emigrants to the United States
Dutch mechanical engineers
Harvard University faculty
MIT School of Engineering faculty
People from Semarang Regency
Swanson School of Engineering alumni
Members of the United States National Academy of Sciences
Members of the United States National Academy of Engineering
Dutch people of the Dutch East Indies